The 2023 British Virgin Islands general election is a general election due to be held in the British Virgin Islands on 24 April 2023.

Although there had been a delay in announcing the date of the election, campaigning had started some weeks before the date of the election had been announced. After the House of Assembly was dissolved for the election on 10 March 2023 there was then a short delay before the election date was confirmed.

Background
The House of Assembly normally sits in four-year terms.  The Governor must dissolve the House within four years of the date when the House first meets after a general election unless it has been dissolved sooner.  Once the House is dissolved a general election must be held after at least 21 days, but not more than two months after the dissolution of the House.

The elections are the first since the 2021 Commission of Inquiry which recommended the suspension of the Territory's constitution after finding that "[a]lmost everywhere, the principles of good governance, such as openness, transparency and even the rule of law, are ignored".  Ultimately the UK government did not act upon that recommendation.  In response to the report the Territory formed a "unity government" including members of the opposition NDP and PVIM in Cabinet.

The elections also follow the arrest of the country's Premier Andrew Fahie, in Miami on charges relating to drug smuggling. Fahie was removed as Premier, representative of the First District, and eader of his political party. Natalio Wheatley succeeded him as Premier and party leader.

Electoral system
The House of Assembly has a total of 15 members, 13 of whom are members elected by the public to serve a four-year term, plus two ex-officio non-voting members: the Attorney General and the Speaker of the House.  Of the 13 elected members, nine are elected via first-past-the-post voting to represent territorial district seats, and four are elected on a territory-wide "at-large" basis via plurality block voting.

Parties and candidates

Virgin Islands Party
The incumbent Virgin Islands Party (VIP) was led by Andrew Fahie in the previous general election, but following his arrest on charges of drug smuggling offences, leadership of the party passed to Natalio Wheatley.  The party was the first to confirm a full slate of candidates.

National Democratic Party

The National Democratic Party (NDP) is led by Marlon Penn (D8).  Former Deputy Premier Kedrick Pickering left the party before the 2019 election (where he lost his seat), but subsequently rejoined it for the 2023 election (at-large). Former party leader, Myron Walwyn, has also been confirmed as a candidate despite a pending criminal matter relating to his previous time as a Minister (D6).  Other candidates named on the party's Facebook page include Sandy Harrigan-Underhill (D4), Renard Estridge (at-large) and Aaron Parillon (D3).

After initially declaring as an independent candidate, Lorna Smith, the wife of former Premier Orlando Smith, indicated she would run at-large for the NDP.

Progressive Virgin Islands Movement

The leader of the Progressive Virgin Islands Movement (PVIM), Ronnie Skelton, failed to win a seat in the 2019 election, and so Mitch Turnbull (D2) assumed leadership of the party in the House.  However, for the 2023 campaign Mr Skelton has resumed leadership of the party.  The party's ranks were also bolstered when representative Shereen Flax-Charles (at-large) crossed the floor to join the PVIM.

Other confirmed candidates so far include Sylvia Moses (D1), Paul Hewlett (D4), Stacy "Buddha" Mather (at-large), former Speaker of the House Ingrid Moses-Scatliffe (at-large), and Shaina Smith-Archer (at-large).

Progressives United

Julian Fraser, the current Leader of the Opposition by default being the only member of the House of Assembly not in the "unity government", is the leader and only sitting member of the Progressives United (PU).  It remains unclear whether he will try and recruit members to run with him, or simply run again as an independent.

Independents

A number of independent candidates have indicated they will stand.  They include Perline Scatliffe-Leonard (D7), Karen Vanterpool (at-large) and Rosita Scatliffe-Thompson (D4).

Candidates stepping down

Mark Vanterpool (NDP) has confirmed that he will not be defending his District 4 seat and is retiring from politics.

Developments

NDP and PVIM merger talks
The NDP and PVIM conducted exploratory merger talks, but ultimately those talks were not successful.  The PVIM had originally been formed when a number of members of the NDP split away and formed a competing party before the 2019 election.

References

British Virgin Islands
British Virgin Islands
General election
Elections in the British Virgin Islands